The Sony Xperia T2 Ultra is an Android smartphone developed by Sony Mobile Communications. It was announced in January 2014 and was released in March 2014.

Specifications

Hardware
The Sony Xperia T2 Ultra has a 6.0-inch IPS LCD display, Quad-core 1.4 GHz Cortex-A7 Qualcomm Snapdragon 400 processor, 1 GB of RAM and 8 GB of internal storage that can be expanded using microSD cards up to 32 GB. The phone has a 3000 mAh Li-Ion battery, 13 MP rear camera with LED flash and 1.1 MP front-facing camera. It is available in Black, White, Purple colors.

Software
Sony Xperia T2 Ultra ships with Android 4.3 Jelly Bean and is upgradable to Android 5.1 Lollipop.

References

Android (operating system) devices
T2 Ultra